Comitas exstructa is a species of sea snail, a marine gastropod mollusc in the family Pseudomelatomidae.

Description
The length of the shell attains 24 mm, its diameter 7 mm.

Distribution
This marine species occurs off the Nicobar Islands at depths of more than 800 m.

References

External links
 Martens, Eduard von, - Thiele, Johannes, Die beschalten Gasteropoden der deutschen Tiefsee-Expedition, 1898-1899; Jena,G. Fischer,1904
 

exstructa
Taxa named by Eduard von Martens
Gastropods described in 1904